The FIS Ski Flying World Ski Championships 1996 took place on 11 February 1996 in Bad Mitterndorf, Austria for the third time. Bad Mitterndorf hosted the championships previously in 1975 and 1986. At these championships, the number of jumps expanded from two to four.

Individual
11 February 1996

Medal table

References
 FIS Ski flying World Championships 1996 results. - accessed 28 November 2009.

FIS Ski Flying World Championships
1996 in ski jumping
1996 in Austrian sport
February 1996 sports events in Europe
Ski jumping competitions in Austria
Sport in Styria